Anthony Ernest (Tony) Gallo (born February 3, 1939) is an American playwright.  He has written over 60 dramatic works.

Early life
Anthony Gallo was born on February 3, 1939, and raised in Vandergrift, Pennsylvania.  He is the son of Saveria Raso and Domenic Gallo. In 1940, a house fire killed Anthony's brother and left his father, a factory worker, in poor health.

Anthony Gallo received an undergraduate degree from the College of William and Mary and a master's degree from the Wharton School. He then worked as a banker, a college professor, and a food marketing economist with the federal government. He was also a pioneer in the renovation of historic homes in the Capitol Hill Historic District in Washington, DC.

Gallo's career as a playwright began in 1980 when he visited Israel. On his return, Gallo became interested in Judeo-Christian studies  and decided to become a playwright. This decision was also influenced by his friend, Herbert Stein.  After retirement in 1996, Gallo became a prolific playwright, dubbed the "Wharton School Playwright" by his friends.

In 2007, Gallo married Susan Flaum Hesser, an information technology executive.  Gallo has one son from a previous marriage, Thomas Augustus Gallo.

Writing career 
Gallo has created over 60 works. Gallo owns his own theater company, the Seventh Street Playhouse, and motion picture company, Eastern Market Studios. While he defines himself as a Judeo-Christian playwright, he states that all of his plays are meant for general audiences. His only guiding maxim is that there are a million roads to God, "and I hope I am on the right one."

Two of Gallo's plays are Holocaust dramas (Margherita and Eugenio) and two are Biblical dramas (The Agony of David and The Last Days of King Solomon). Five of his plays are about American civilization (Vandergrift, Lincoln and God, Better than the Best, Charleston Revisited, and the Botticelli Cruise). Gallo's play, Paul, is an examination of the life of the Apostle Paul. Heathcliff is Gallo's first absurdist comedy.

Gallo's plays have been staged nearly 100 times in 40 venues, including in Washington, DC: The Kennedy Center, The National Press Club, Woolly Mammoth Theatre Company, Cosmos Theatre, The Universalist Stage, The Warehouse Theater, The Corner Store Stage, and the Capital Fringe Festival; in New York City: New York University, New York International Midtown Festival/Dorothy Strelsin Stage, The Dramatists Guild of America, Casa Italiana, Where Eagles Dare Theatre, Abingdon Theatre, and Midtown International Theatre Festival where one of his actresses won best supporting actress; and in Maryland: The Greenbelt Arts Center, Silver Spring Stage/PF, and St. John's Church.

Three of Gallo's plays (Margherita, Eugenio, and Lincoln and God) are under contract to the Nederlander Producing Group for production in New York City.  Margherita was scheduled to be jointly produced by Brown–Nederlander and the Seventh Street Playhouse in 2012.

Stage plays 
"Margherita" on the relationship between Benito Mussolini and Margherita Sarfatti,  based on the Book of Judith.
"Eugenio" on the conversion of Israel Zolli, Rome's Chief Rabbi, in 1944.
"The Last Days of King Solomon" on doubt and faith during the rule of King Solomon.
"The Agony of David” on the life of King David.
"Vandergrift" on a businessman trying to reconcile capitalism with his Presbyterian religion to create a workers' paradise.
"Lincoln and God" on Abraham Lincoln and God during the American Civil War 
"Charleston Revisited" set on Logan Street in Charleston, South Carolina.
"The Botticelli Cruise" on a cruise along the east coast of Africa.
"Paul" on the Apostle Paul.
"Heathcliff in America" an absurdist play set in Rehoboth Beach, Delaware.
"The Tragedy of King Saul" on King Saul
"The Eaton Woman" on Peggy Eaton and the Petticoat Affair during the Andrew Jackson Administration
Teresa on St. Teresa of Avila.
*Better than the Best on nineteenth century capitalism
"Luther" on the theologian Martin Luther.
"Mr. Morris!  Mr. Morris!" on the financier of the American Revolution, Robert Morris
"Madame Caillaux" on the 1914 murder trial of Henriette Caillaux. 
"Robert" a surrealistic drama on Robert Todd Lincoln
"Jonathan" on Jonathan, the son of King Saul. 
"Shakespeare and Lincoln" a surrealistic play on William Shakespeare and Abraham Lincoln .
"Cabala" about Rome during the 1920s. 
"The Springfield Boys" on the relationship between Abraham Lincoln, Joshua Speed, and William Herndon

Film and musicals 
The playwright is also very much involved in film-making and screenwriting. The Eastern Market Studios in Washington is currently shooting a feature film, Charleston Revisited, based on Gallo's successful stage play. He is also the librettist and lyricist for four musicals: Lincoln and God (John Ward composer), Vandergrift (Beatrix Whitehall composer), Peggy (Margaret and Grant Bagley composers), and David (Margaret and Grant Bagley composers).

Publications 
Margherita: ; Eugenio: ; The Last Days of King Solomon: ; The Agony of David: . Available From Browns Court Publishing Company: February 2010: Seven Religious Dramas By Anthony E. Gallo, Edited By Lenny Levy; August 2009: Eight Dramas By Anthony E. Gallo, June 2008: Seven Dramas By Anthony E. Gallo, July 2006: Five Dramas By Anthony E. Gallo, November 2005: The Complete Plays Of Anthony E. Gallo. Single Plays: The Last Days Of King Solomon, November 2008; The Agony Of David: July 2007; Lincoln And God: August 2007; Margherita: July 2006; Eugenio: July 2006; Better Than The Best: July 2006; Vandergrift!: December 2006; Charleston Revisited: July 2006. British Publications: Margherita: New Theatre Publications, January 2009; Vandergrift!: New Theatre Publications, June 2009.

References

Additional references
 Arguello, Julio, Voice of the Hill, Cap Hill Playwright. page 20 July 2008
 Colarco, Renee, Dramatist Diary, May–June 2010 selected Issues 2002-2011
 Jackson, Wanda, Prince Georges Sentinel, August 18, Vandergrift: Vandergrift! at The Greenbelt Arts, June 5, 2011
 McCall, Celeste, More Hill Theatrics, April 2009.
 Ryan Reilly, The Gazette, Playwright Debuts play about Life in Greenbelt.  Thursday, August 5, 2010.
 Vandergrift News, "National Press Club Presents Vandergrift," Vandergrift, PA, September 1, 2007
 Wells, Carolyn, Review, Vandergrift, Community News. September 2007
 Washington Post, Selected issues 2007–present

External links 
Dollee
Dramatists Guild of America
Stageplays
Play Data Base

20th-century American dramatists and playwrights
1939 births
Living people
People from Vandergrift, Pennsylvania
Writers from Pennsylvania
College of William & Mary alumni
Wharton School of the University of Pennsylvania alumni